George William Kavanagh (1880 – April 4, 1914) was an American lawyer and politician from New York.

Life
He was born in 1880 in Greenpoint, Brooklyn, the son of Murtha H. Kavanagh (1844–1940) and Margaret Kavanagh (1856–1901). He attended St. Anthony's Parochial School and St. Leonard's Academy. He graduated from New York University School of Law, and practiced law in Brooklyn.

Kavanagh entered politics as a Democrat. He was a member of the New York State Assembly (Kings Co., 14th D.) in 1905 and 1906.

He died on April 4, 1914, and was buried at the Calvary Cemetery in Queens.

References

1880 births
1914 deaths
Politicians from Brooklyn
Democratic Party members of the New York State Assembly
New York University School of Law alumni
20th-century American politicians
19th-century American politicians
People from Greenpoint, Brooklyn